CIHO-FM is a French language community radio station that broadcasts at 96.3 FM in Saint-Hilarion, Quebec, Canada. Its network of five transmitters serves the Charlevoix and Charlevoix-Est RCMs in the Capitale-Nationale region northeast of Quebec City.

Owned by Radio MF Charlevoix, the station was licensed in 1985.

On August 28, 2009, Radio MF Charlevoix received CRTC approval for a new French language Class B community FM radio station in Saint-Hilarion, with repeaters in La Malbaie, Baie-Saint-Paul, Petite-Rivière-Saint-François and Saint-Siméon; this license, which was not consummated and expired in August 2011, would have replaced the previous license for the station held by Radio MF Charlevoix.

The station is a member of the Association des radiodiffuseurs communautaires du Québec.

Transmitters

References

External links
CIHO FM
 

Iho
Iho
Iho
Radio stations established in 1985
1985 establishments in Quebec